The Union of Patriotic Forces and Militaries of the Reserve Zashtita (Sajuz na Patrioticnite Sili i Voinite ot Zapaca Zacšita) is a nationalist political party in Bulgaria founded in December 1998. Since 2021, SPSZ are part of Bulgarian Patriots

External links
Official site

Nationalist parties in Bulgaria